Stereocerus is a genus of beetles in the family Carabidae, containing the following species:

 Stereocerus haematopus Dejean, 1831
 Stereocerus rubripes Motschulsky, 1860

References

Pterostichinae